Shankarrao Chavan was appointed as Chief Minister of Maharashtra for the first time on 21 February 1975, replacing Vasantrao Naik. His first ministry lasted till 16 April 1977, and was succeeded by Vasantdada Patil's ministry.

Government formation
After Congress securing a supermajority in 1972 legislative elections, the incumbent chief minister Vasantrao Naik had continued in his office. After 11 years as head of government, Naik resigned in 1975. Chavan, MLA from Bhokar was minister of irrigation and power in Naik's cabinet, and was selected to succeed Naik.

Chavan resigned in April 1977, after Congress lost several Lok Sabha seats in 1977 Indian general election, and was replaced by his irrigation minister, Vasantdada Patil. After briefly serving as Indian minister of home affairs, Chavan would be appointed chief minister for the second time in March 1986. His son, Ashok Chavan served in the same office between 2008 and 2010.

List of ministers
Chavan's ministry contained 14 cabinet ministers, alongside other junior ministers. Three of his ministers - Vasantdada Patil, A. R. Antulay, and Sharad Pawar - later served as Maharashtra chief ministers; while Pratibha Patil was elected President of India from 2007 to 2012.

The initial ministry consisted of the following:

References

Indian National Congress
C
C
Cabinets established in 1975
Cabinets disestablished in 1977